The Platte County Courthouse is a historic three-story building in Columbus, Nebraska, and the courthouse of Platte County, Nebraska. It is the second courthouse for Platte County; the first one was built in 1868–1870. The current courthouse was built in 1920–1922, and designed in the Classical Revival style by architect Charles Wurdeman. It has been listed on the National Register of Historic Places since January 10, 1990.

References

		
National Register of Historic Places in Platte County, Nebraska
County courthouses in Nebraska
Neoclassical architecture in Nebraska
Government buildings completed in 1920
1920 establishments in Nebraska